Callatis Club is a post-festival show aired every year during the Callatis Festival on the Romanian TV channel TVR 2. The show was hosted in 2006 by Cătălin Măruță, and by Leonard Miron in 2008 and most of the singers who performed on the stage of the festival are invited.

In 2006, several scandals emerged during this show. The most important was the one between the host Gabriel Cotabiţă and the singer Cream, the latter disputing Cotabiţă's competence as a general producer of the festival.

After a break from Romanian National Television in 2007, it returned to the national channel TVR2 with Leonard Miron, and focused less on scandals and more on interviewing guests, giving them the chance to discuss the festival itself and the music.

Festivals in Romania
Romanian music